Pierre Nguyên Van Tot (born 15 April 1949) is a Vietnamese prelate of the Catholic Church and a diplomat of the Holy See.

Biography 
Pierre Nguyên Van Tot was born on 15 April 1949 in Thủ Dầu Một, Bình Dương Province, Vietnam. He was ordained a priest of the Diocese of Phu Cuong on 24 March 1974.

He joined the diplomatic service of the Holy See on 1 May 1985 and fulfilled assignments in  Panama, Brazil, Zaire, Rwanda, and France. He became chargé d’affaires in Benin on 27 November 1999. He earned a degree from the Pontifical Urban University in 1987.

On 25 November 2002, Pope John Paul II appointed him the Titular Archbishop of Rusticiana and Apostolic Nuncio to Benin and Togo. He received his episcopal consecration from Pope John Paul on 6 January 2003.

On 24 August 2005, Pope Benedict XVI named him Apostolic Nuncio to Chad and the Central African Republic. Pope Benedict appointed him Nuncio to Costa Rica on 13 May 2008.

On 22 March 2014, Pope Francis appointed him Apostolic Nuncio to Sri Lanka. Pope Francis accepted his resignation on 2 January 2020.

Writings

See also
 List of heads of the diplomatic missions of the Holy See

References

External links 
 Archbishop Pierre Nguyễn Văn Tốt

Pontifical Urban University alumni
Apostolic Nuncios to Costa Rica
Apostolic Nuncios to Chad
Apostolic Nuncios to the Central African Republic
Apostolic Nuncios to Sri Lanka
Vietnamese Roman Catholic bishops
People from Bình Dương Province
Living people
1949 births
21st-century Roman Catholic titular archbishops